Six ships of the United States Navy have borne the name USS Patapsco, named for the Patapsco River in Maryland.

  a sloop laid down as USS Chesapeake, but renamed while under construction.
 
 
  a Passaic-class ironclad monitor during the American Civil War.
  the lead ship of her class of tugs between 1911 and 1936.
  the lead ship of her class of gasoline tankers during World War II, the Korean War and Vietnam.

United States Navy ship names